The following ships of the Indian Navy have been named Rajput:

  was a R-class destroyer acquired in 1949 from the Royal Navy, where it served in World War II as 
  was the lead vessel of her class of destroyers which was decommissioned in 2021. 

Indian Navy ship names